Re Vandervell Trustees Ltd  [1971] AC 912 is a UK tax law case, concerning the ability of the Revenue to amend tax assessments.

This case was the second in a series of decisions involving Tony Vandervell's trusts and his tax liability. The first was Vandervell v Inland Revenue Commissioners, which concerned whether an oral instruction to transfer an equitable interest in shares complied with the writing requirement under Law of Property Act 1925, section 53(1)(c), and so whether receipt of dividends was subject to tax.

The third was Re Vandervell Trustees Ltd (No 2), which concerned whether Vandervell could be taxed because he could have an equitable interest through a resulting trust if he had exercised an option right.

Facts
Lord Diplock also summarised the facts as follows.

Judgment
The House of Lords held the court had no jurisdiction under R.S.C., Order 15, regulation 6(2), to order that the Inland Revenue Commissioners would be added as a party to the proceedings, so that it could be determined if dividends belonged to the executors (which would mattered for tax liability) and the decision would be binding on the commissioners.

See also
UK tax law
English trusts law

Notes

References

English trusts case law
1971 in case law
1971 in British law
House of Lords cases